ezmlm is mailing list management software (MLM) by Daniel J. Bernstein. It is similar to GNU Mailman and Majordomo but only works with the qmail mail transfer agent. It is released into the public domain. The latest version, 0.53, came out in 1997.

The related program ezmlm-idx originated as an add-on to ezmlm. It now exists as a complete package on its own, but can still be considered essentially as an extension to ezmlm. It adds multi-message threaded message retrieval from the archive, digests, message and subscription moderation, and a number of remote administration functions. The latest version, 7.2.2, was released May 15, 2014.

Features 
ezmlm provides all of the common electronic mailing list functionality: moderated lists, automated subscription and unsubscription, and digest creation. ezmlm takes advantage of the features of qmail to enable ordinary users to create and to manage mailing lists, without need for superuser privileges.

Unlike some other mailing list management software, ezmlm's user interface is command-based. The mailing list administrator usually does not have to edit files. For example, the command to create a new mailing list is:

and the commands to (manually) subscribe someone to and unsubscribe someone from that list are:

and:

The operation of each individual mailing list is controlled by files in the list's directory ( in the given example). That directory also contains an archive of all messages sent to the list.

Whether a list is moderated or not is controlled by the existence of a file in the list's directory, named . In the given example, this file would be . If the file exists, the list is not moderated, and anyone can subscribe to and unsubscribe from the mailing list by sending (empty) electronic mail messages to special  and  electronic mailboxes. The ezmlm-idx extension provides more moderation mechanisms.

Standard ezmlm does not include a web interface, but the ezmlm-web extension provides that functionality.

Ezmlm works very fast since it makes use of database type files, while many other mailing list managers use flat ascii files. Ezmlm also has a very good security record.

See also 

 Electronic mailing list
 List of mailing list software

Further reading

References

External links 
 Information and manuals for ezmlm and ezmlm-idx
 An administration web interface for ezmlm
 Set of scripts which add to the ezmlm package the ability to reencrypt messages sent to the list

Free mailing list software
Mailing list software for Linux
Public-domain software with source code